Jiroft County (Ŝahrestāne Jiroft) is in Kerman province, Iran. The capital of the county is the city of Jiroft. At the 2006 census, the county's population was 181,300 in 38,307 households. The following census in 2011 counted 277,748 people in 68,618 households, by which time Esmaili District had been separated from Anbarabad County to join Jiroft County. At the 2016 census, the county's population was 308,858 in 92,937 households.

Administrative divisions

The population history and structural changes of Jiroft County's administrative divisions over three consecutive censuses are shown in the following table. The latest census shows four districts, 14 rural districts, and four cities.

References

 

Counties of Kerman Province